Elections to South Cambridgeshire District Council took place on Thursday 1 May 2008, as part of the 2008 United Kingdom local elections. Twenty seats, making up just over one third of South Cambridgeshire District Council, were up for election. Both seats in Gamlingay were contested at this election after one of the councillors retired earlier in the year. Seats up for election in 2008 were last contested at the 2004 election, and were next contested at the 2012 election. The Conservative Party retained their majority on the council.

Summary
At this election, Conservatives were defending 8 seats, Independents were defending 6 seats and Liberal Democrats 5 seats. Labour were defending their only seat on the council in Bassingbourn. Several councillors had switched parties in the year leading up to the election, with independents Mark Howell (Papworth and Elsworth) and Simon Edwards (Cottenham) joining the Conservatives, while Liberal Democrat James Quinlan (Whittlesford) ran for re-election as an Independent. Incumbent Liberal Democrat Val Trueman also ran as an independent in Melbourn. Conservatives gained the latter two seats at the election, but lost in Girton to an independent candidate. No other seats changed hands.

Results

Results by ward

References

2008
2008 English local elections
2000s in Cambridgeshire